Leozinho is a nickname. It may refer to:

 Leozinho (fighter) (born 1976), Leonardo Alcantara Vieira, Brazilian grappler and Jiu-Jitsu instructor
 Leozinho (footballer, born 1985), Leandro Sales de Santana, Brazilian football attacking midfielder
 Leozinho (footballer, born 1988), Leonardo Ferreira, Brazilian football attacking midfielder
 Leozinho (footballer, born 1991), Leonardo dos Santos Lima, Brazilian football forward